The Fighting Doctor is a 1926 action film directed by Robert N. Bradbury and starring Frank Merrill, Edward Cecil and George Kotsonaros.

Cast
 Frank Merrill as 	Dr. Frank Martin
 Edward Cecil as 	George Stafford
 J.C. Fowler as Malcolm Sanders
 George Kotsonaros as 	Scissors Lomski, the Bull from Montana
 Jack P. Pierce as 'Chug' Wilson
 Florence Ulrich as Susie Sanders
 Monty O'Grady as 	Little Boy

References

Bibliography
 Connelly, Robert B. The Silents: Silent Feature Films, 1910-36, Volume 40, Issue 2. December Press, 1998.
 Munden, Kenneth White. The American Film Institute Catalog of Motion Pictures Produced in the United States, Part 1. University of California Press, 1997.

External links
 

1926 films
1920s action films
1920s English-language films
American silent feature films
American action films
American black-and-white films
Films directed by Robert N. Bradbury
Silent action films
1920s American films